The 2022-23 Super 6 (also known as the Fosroc Super 6 for sponsorship reasons) is the third season of a semi-professional rugby union competition for Scotland's club sides. The season tournament for 2020–21 did not take place due to the COVID-19 pandemic.

The six teams competing in this season's Super 6 are Ayrshire Bulls, Boroughmuir Bears, Heriot's Rugby, Stirling Wolves, Watsonians and Southern Knights.

Competition format

Super 6 consists of 3 different competitions involving the same six teams.

Super6 Championship

 League Stage : Weeks One to Ten
All sides will play each other home and away in a double round robin, using the rugby points system.

 League play-offs

Semi-Finals : The top 4 teams play off determine the finalist slots. 

Final : The winners of the semi-finals compete in the final of the Super 6 tournament .

Coronavirus pandemic
The fixtures announced are subject to Scottish Government regulations regarding the COVID-19 pandemic.

Table

League stage rounds

All times are local.

Round 1

Round 2

Round 3

Round 4

Round 5

Round 6

Round 7

Round 8

Round 9

Round 10

Semi-finals

Super 6 final

Team of the tournament

The 2022–23 Super 6 commentator's team of the tournament was named as follows:-

Leading Points scorers

The leading points scorers from the League Stage rounds of the competition.

References

External links
SRU Super 6

2022
2022–23 in Scottish rugby union